9 de Octubre Fútbol Club, simply referred to as Nueve (9) de Octubre, is a sports club based in Guayaquil, Ecuador. The club is best known for its football team.

Founded in 1912, the club's name commemorates the date the city of Guayaquil declared their independence from Spain (October 9).

History

The club was founded on August 25, 1912 as a football club called Club Sport 9 de Octubre, although it was refounded on April 18, 1926 as a multi-sport club called 9 de Octubre. 

During its amateur years, the football team won two Guayas tournaments in 1940 and 1946. The team turned professional in 1962, and participated in the national championship that same year. The following year, the club was runner-up in the professional Guayas tournament. In 1965, the team was national runner-up, which allowed them to participate in their first Copa Libertadores. They achieved back-to-back runners-up in 1983 and 1984, and is seen as the peak of the club's football success. Since then, the team has descended in the Ecuadorian football league system to the third level of football, the Segunda Categoría.

The team had a total of a 22 years being stuck in the Segunda Categoria but they made their return to the Ecuadorian Serie B after being 2nd placers in the Segunda Categoria Tournament

In 2020 they won the Serie B officially returning to Ecuador's top division after 25 years of absence and will compete in Liga Pro Serie A in 2021.

Honors
National
Serie B: 2020  
Amateur
Campeonato Amateur del Fútbol de Guayaquil (2): 1940, 1946

Players

Current squad
As of 5 March 2022.

References

External links

9 de Octubre
1912 establishments in Ecuador
Sports clubs established in 1912